Bo Hoag (born July 25, 1988) is an American professional golfer who plays on the PGA Tour. Hoag began golfing at an early age and grew up a few blocks from renowned golfer Jack Nicklaus's boyhood home. He was named the 2006 Ohio Player of the Year and was the 2006 Division I Ohio High School individual medalist on Upper Arlington High School's Division I state championship team. After playing collegiate golf at Ohio State University and a season on the PGA Tour Canada, Hoag won the 2019 WinCo Foods Portland Open on the Korn Ferry Tour to clinch his PGA Tour card.

Early years and education
Hoag was born in Columbus, Ohio and raised in Upper Arlington, Ohio. His grandfather, Robert Hoag, was a founding member and eventual chairman emeritus of Muirfield Village Golf Club in Dublin, Ohio, the Jack Nicklaus-designed golf course that hosts the yearly Memorial Tournament on the PGA Tour. Like Nicklaus, Hoag played for Upper Arlington High School. Hoag was the Ohio Capital Conference League Player of the year in 2004, 2005, and 2006. The 2006 season culminated in Hoag winning individual state medalist honors as part of Upper Arlington's Division I State Championship team in men's golf.

Hoag played collegiate golf at the Ohio State University, again like Nicklaus, where he earned first-team All-Big Ten honors in 2009 and 2011 and was an honorable mention All-American in 2009. He averaged 73.04 strokes per 18 holes in college, the fourth-best career average in Ohio State history.

Professional career 
Hoag turned professional in 2011 after graduating from Ohio State with a degree in economics. He scored low in an open qualifier and played his first PGA Tour event in 2012 at the Honda Classic in Florida and was awarded a special exemption to play in the 2012 Memorial Tournament. After playing the 2013 season on the PGA Tour Canada, Hoag played from 2017 to 2019 on the Korn Ferry Tour. In 2019, Hoag ranked 2nd on the Korn Ferry Tour in greens in regulation at 76% and 8th in scoring average at 69.71 strokes per round. He won the WinCo Foods Portland Open on August 11, 2019, after shooting −22 over the four days to capture not only his first professional victory but also his PGA Tour card for the 2019–20 PGA Tour season.

During the 2019–20 PGA Tour season, Hoag barely retained his PGA Tour card after finishing 125th on the FedEx Cup points list (the top 125 earn cards for the following season).

After making only 15 of 31 cuts during the 2020–21 PGA Tour season, Hoag lost his PGA Tour card, but retained conditional status, which enabled him to get into some tournaments during the 2021–22 PGA Tour season.

Amateur wins
2009 Monroe Invitational

Source:

Professional wins (1)

Korn Ferry Tour wins (1)

Results in major championships

CUT = missed the half-way cut

Results in The Players Championship

CUT = missed the halfway cut

Personal
Hoag has great interest in cars and lists Freakonomics as his favorite book. He considers Jack Nicklaus as a personal friend and mentor.

See also
2019 Korn Ferry Tour Finals graduates

References

External links
 
 

American male golfers
Ohio State Buckeyes men's golfers
PGA Tour golfers
Korn Ferry Tour graduates
Golfers from Columbus, Ohio
People from Upper Arlington, Ohio
1988 births
Living people